Franc Pribošek (1917 – 1981) was a Yugoslavian ski jumper. He participated in two Winter Olympics: in 1936 he finished 39th in the normal hill competition in Garmisch-Partenkirchen, and in 1948 he improved on his previous Olympic result with a finish of 32nd in the normal hill competition in St. Moritz. Also in 1936, Pribošek competed in some of the first ever ski flying events on the then-new Bloudkova velikanka hill in Planica.

References

1917 births
1981 deaths
Yugoslav male ski jumpers
Slovenian male ski jumpers
Skiers from Ljubljana
Ski jumpers at the 1936 Winter Olympics
Ski jumpers at the 1948 Winter Olympics
Olympic ski jumpers of Yugoslavia